Joseph Julien Claude Pierre Mondou (born November 27, 1955) is a former Canadian ice hockey forward.

Mondou played in the National Hockey League from 1977 to 1985.  During this time, he played for the Montreal Canadiens his entire career.  He won three Stanley Cups while with the Habs in 1977, 1978 and 1979. He passed the 30-goal mark three times, and scored 29 goals one other season. His career ended shortly after he was hit in the eye by a high stick from Ulf Samuelsson. He later served as a scout for the Canadiens, earning a Stanley Cup ring with the team in 1993, but his name was not included on the Cup.

Career statistics

References

External links

1955 births
Living people
Canadian ice hockey centres
Ice hockey people from Quebec
Montreal Bleu Blanc Rouge players
Montreal Canadiens draft picks
Montreal Canadiens players
Montreal Canadiens scouts
National Hockey League first-round draft picks
New Jersey Devils scouts
Nova Scotia Voyageurs players
Sportspeople from Sorel-Tracy
Quebec Nordiques (WHA) draft picks
Sorel Éperviers players
Stanley Cup champions
World Hockey Association first round draft picks